Archer River is a rural locality in the Shire of Cook, Queensland, Australia. In the  Archer River had a population of 22 people.

Geography
This inland locality takes its name from the Archer River which flows from east to west across the locality towards the Gulf of Carpentaria. The Oyala Thumotang National Park (formerly known as Mungkan Kandju National Park and Archer Bend National Park) is in the south-west of the locality.

The Peninsula Developmental Road passes through the locality in a NW-SE direction connecting Weipa on the Gulf of Carpentaria to Lakeland. There are two major road junctions within Archer River from the Peninsula Developmental Road. At  there
is a turn-off towards the north onto the Telegraph Road towards Bamaga at the northern tip of Cape York Peninsula. At  there is a turn-off towards the north-east on Portland Road to the Lockhart River community on the Coral Sea coast.

History 
Kaanju (also known as Kaanju and Kandju) is a language of Cape York. The Kaanju language region includes the landscape within the local government boundaries of the Cook Shire Council.

Linngithigh (also known as Winda Winda and Linginiti) an Australian Aboriginal language spoken by the Linngithigh people. The Linngithigh language region includes landscape within the local government boundaries of the Cook Shire Council: Western Cape York, Winda Winda Creek, Mission River, and Archer River.

In the  Archer River had a population of 22 people.

Amenities
The Archer River Roadhouse is located on the Peninsula Developmental Road immediately south of the Archer River. It provides accommodation, laundry, meals, fuel, minor motor vehicle repairs, and internet access.

Heritage listings 
Archer River has a number of heritage-listed sites, including:
 Wenlock Goldfield

References

 
Shire of Cook
Populated places in Far North Queensland
Localities in Queensland